The SNCF Class CC 14100 was a class of 25 kV 50 Hz AC electric centre cab locomotives designed to haul heavy freight trains in the northeast of France and cross-border traffic into Luxembourg. A total of 101 locomotives were produced, numbered CC 14101 – CC 14202.

Service use
Introduced at the time when steam traction was being phased out, the torque of these locomotives was exceptional. During tests, a CC 14100 started a train weighing  on an 1.1% slope, and a  train on a 0.5% slope. Their slow speed of  became a liability in later years and by 1986 individual locomotives were being withdrawn as they came due for overhaul or major repairs. The last members of the class survived until 1997, mainly on shunting duties.

Preservation
CC 14161 is on display on a short length of track next to a supermarket car park in Conflans-en-Jarnisy. CC 14183 is at the Carreau Wendel Museum at Petite-Rosselle.

References

14100
C-C locomotives
14100
CC 14100
Standard gauge locomotives of France

Freight locomotives 
Railway locomotives introduced in 1954